
Gmina Sławno is a rural gmina (administrative district) in Sławno County, West Pomeranian Voivodeship, in north-western Poland. Its seat is the town of Sławno, although the town is not part of the territory of the gmina.

Villages
Gmina Sławno contains the villages and settlements of Bobrowice, Bobrowiczki, Boleszewo, Boleszewo-Kolonia, Borzyszkowiec, Brzeście, Chomiec, Emilianowo, Graniczniak, Grzybno, Gwiazdówko, Gwiazdowo, Janiewice, Krakowiany, Kwasowo, Łany, Łętowo, Noskowo, Pątnowo, Pomiłowo, Przemysławiec, Radosław, Rzyszczewko, Rzyszczewo, Sławsko, Smardzewo, Stary Kraków, Tokary, Tychowo, Waliszewo, Warginia, Warszkówko, Warszkowo, Warszkowo-Kolonia, Wrześnica, Żabno, Żukówko and Żukowo.

Neighbouring gminas
Gmina Sławno is bordered by the town of Sławno and by the gminas of Darłowo, Kępice, Kobylnica, Malechowo, Polanów and Postomino.

References
Polish official population figures 2006

Slawno
Sławno County